Rohanixalus punctatus is a species of frog in the family Rhacophoridae. It is endemic to Myanmar.

Taxonomy and systematics
It was given the common name of Myanmar spotted treefrog when it was first described in 2003 on the basis of an adult male frog collected at the headquarters of the Rakhine Yoma Elephant Range. Formerly described in Chirixalus, it was moved to the new genus Rohanixalus in 2020 following a phylogenetic study.

Description 
The Myanmar spotted treefrog is light brown in colour with dark spots on head, back and legs. Its head is round with a pointed, elevated snout and slightly protuberant nostrils. Its vocal sac is external, and it does not have vomerine teeth. Its fingers are opposable and the third finger is the longest and has the largest disk. The webbing between the third and fourth fingers is short, and absent between the other fingers. Males are smaller than females.

Habitat and ecology
Individuals were found in disturbed habitat between mountain evergreen forests and agricultural land, 1-2m above the ground in bushes. This species may be restricted to remaining secondary habitat in Rakhine as remnant populations, or (as with Chirixalus species in Myanmar) they might prefer degraded habitats. Animals were not found in evergreen forests. The eggs are deposited in foam nests, in particular on plants of the genus Arum, hanging over standing water. The larvae presumably develop in the water.

References

External links 

Rohanixalus
Amphibians of Myanmar
Endemic fauna of Myanmar
Taxonomy articles created by Polbot
Amphibians described in 2003